Galman may refer to:

 Ann-Sofie Gälman, Swedish television presenter and journalist
 Rolando Galman, alleged hitman of Benigno Aquino Jr.
 Galman Empire, a fictional empire in Space Battleship Yamato